Shri Upendra Tripathy is a retired Indian Administrative Service (IAS) officer of Karnataka Cadre. He is the first Director General of the International Solar Alliance. Well known for receiving the prestigious Prime Minister’s Awards for Excellence in Public Administration in individual category, Tripathy received several other awards for his innovations and ideas during his career as a civil servant. He was the first and founding Director General of International Solar Alliance which the first treaty based International Organisation head-quartered in India. ISA is an alliance of 121 countries worldwide focusing on solar power utilisation, co-operation, and sustainable energy. Previously, Mr. Tripathy was the Secretary to Ministry of New and Renewable Energy from 1 April 2014 until 31 October 2016. Mr. Tripathy has been appointed as Advisor cum working president and chairman of executive committee of Odisha Adarsha Vidyalaya on 3rd August 2021   after the death of previous Advisor cum chairman Dr. Bijaya Kumar Sahoo in June 2021 due to covid

About 
Mr. Tripathy (born 5 October 1956) was the first and founding Director General of International Solar Alliance (ISA). He is from Odisha, India. In ex-officio capacity, he has headed as chairperson, Solar Energy Corporation of India (SECI), National Institute of Solar Energy and National Institute of Wind Energy, National Institute of Bio Energy, and Association of Renewable Energy Agencies of States (AREAS).

Initially, he was selected to be the Interim Director General of the newly formed International Solar Alliance, and later he became the first and founding Director General of ISA. Mr. Tripathy is an Indian Administrative Service (IAS) officer of Karnataka Cadre, known for his innovations, ideas and hard work. He has worked with local, provincial and union government in India over the last 40 years and was the 18th secretary of the Ministry of New and Renewable Energy, established in 1982, one of the oldest Ministries in the world in the area of new and renewable energy. He replaced Shri Satish Agnihotri as Secretary on 1 April 2014.

Mr. Tripathy was born and spent his early life in Kahakapur, a remote coastal hamlet in the tail ends of Eastern Ghats hills, near Rambha, Odisha, close to Asia's largest lagoon, Chilika. Tripathy studied in Ravenshaw College, Jawaharlal Nehru University and Carleton University, Ottawa, Canada. He has published one volume of poetry from Writer's Workshop titled "Caged". Best known for his turning around of the city transportation in Bangalore, he received the Extraordinary Citizen award in 2008 from Rotarians in Bangalore, usually reserved for Chief Ministers and doyens of the industry.

Education 
Tripathy has done his master's in Political Science from Jawaharlal Nehru University, New Delhi and master's in Public Administration from Carleton University, Ottawa, Canada. He has undergone various training programme in areas of programme implementation, financial management, sustainable development, quantitative methods and operational research for public policy and management and e-governance. He has also undergone a six weeks SIDA training programme in Sweden in areas of environmental management.

Career 
His institution building abilities and innovations got reflected in building of Hassan Kalamandir (1989), Center for infrastructure, Sustainable Transportation and Urban Planning (CiSTUP) in Indian Institute of Science (2009), Environmental Management Policy Research Institute (EMPRI) (2003), Akshar Foundation (2001), turnaround of Bangalore Metropolitan Transport Corporation (BMTC) (2003–2008) and institution of Nrupatunga Award in Karnataka (2008). For these achievements, and for all his work in transforming a city Transport undertaking in Bangalore into a profit making one, the Prime Minister of India bestowed the PM's Award for Excellence in Public Administration on Tripathy in 2009.
Before joining ISA, Tripathy was Secretary to the Ministry of New & Renewable Energy. Previous to that, he was Adviser (Agriculture and Marine Products) in the Indian Embassy in Brussels. He held the post of Additional Secretary, Cabinet Secretariat; Joint Secretary, Minority Affairs and Deputy Secretary; Ministry of Petroleum & Natural Gas in the Central Government; as well as Chairperson of Karnataka State Pollution Control Board. He has worked in several sectors such as — Revenue Administration, Rural Development, Petroleum Conservation, Agriculture & Horticulture, Agricultural Marketing, Education, Environment & Transportation, and Renewable Energy.

Work Area and Innovation

Awards 

Other awards that recognise his abilities are – Extra-Ordinary Citizens’ Award from Rotary International (2008), Central Board of Irrigation and Power Award for outstanding contribution to India's Renewable Energy Sector (2016), 10th Enertia Life Time Achievement Award (2016) and UBM (2016) as Crusader of the year for Renewable Energy.

See also 

 Ministry of New and Renewable Energy
 Piyush Goyal
 Indian Administrative Services
 Karnataka

References 

Indian Administrative Service officers
Jawaharlal Nehru University alumni
Carleton University alumni
Living people
Year of birth missing (living people)